Marianne Løvendorf (born 23 May 1982) is a Danish former football defender who played for OB Odense, Brøndby IF and the Denmark national team. She made a total of 99 appearances for Brøndby between 2004 and 2008, without scoring any goals.

References

External links
Danish Football Union (DBU) statistics

1982 births
Living people
Danish women's footballers
Denmark women's international footballers
Brøndby IF (women) players
Odense Q players
Women's association football defenders